Davydkovo is a rural locality (a village) in Kubenskoye Rural Settlement, Vologodsky District, Vologda Oblast, Russia. The population was 10 as of 2002.

Geography 
Davydkovo is located 69 km northwest of Vologda (the district's administrative centre) by road. Sinitsyno is the nearest rural locality.

References 

Rural localities in Vologodsky District